The Wenhua Road Night Market is a night market in West District, Chiayi City, Taiwan.

Architecture
The night market stretches along the Wenhua Road for around half a kilometer. The southern section of the road is divided by a central foundation, which acts as a two-lane road during day time and pedestrian zone during night time.

Features
The night market features famous Chiayi snacks and delicacies. Many popular restaurants and traditional dishes can be found along the night market road.

Transportation
The night market is accessible within walking distance east of Chiayi Station of Taiwan Railways Administration , south of Alishan Forest Railway or North of Chiayi BRT Bunhua Rd.intersection Bus stop.

See also

 List of night markets in Taiwan

References

Night markets in Chiayi
West District